William Gunn (1855–1922) was one of Florida's first black doctors. He began his career working as a driver for a doctor at the Knott House. Gunn was born in Leon County, Florida in 1855. He was mentored by Dr. Betton, a white physician who financed Gunn's education at Meharry Medical College after Gunn came to work for him as a driver.

References

1855 births
1922 deaths
People from Leon County, Florida
Physicians from Florida
African-American physicians
20th-century African-American people